The Iranian ambassador in Ashgabat is the official representative of the Government in Tehran to the Government of Turkmenistan.

List of representatives

See also
Iran–Turkmenistan relations

References 

 
Turkmenistan
Iran